RAJUK Bhaban is the head office of Rajdhani Unnayan Kartripakkha (RAJUK), which is the Capital Development Authority of the Government of Bangladesh. RAJUK Bhaban is situated at RAJUK Avenue, Dilkhusha, Dhaka-1000. This is one of the most well known buildings of the Dhaka city.

History 
RAJUK Bhaban was established in 1956 as the head office of Dhaka Improvement Trust (DIT). In that time, RAJUK Bhaban was called as DIT Bhaban. It was designed by architect, Abdulhusein M. Thariani, who was a diploma architect of West Pakistan.  Foundation stone was laid on 10 December 1956 by H.E. H. S. Suhrawardy, who was the prime minister of Pakistan in that time. The DIT Bhaban was where the first transmissions of television in East Pakistan have been commenced and has since been the headquarters of the Dacca station of Pakistan Television Corporation, later renamed to Bangladesh Television, and has remained that way even after Bangladesh's independence in 1971. However, in 1975, as the new headquarters have been constructed in Rampura, Bangladesh Television moved all its offices and studios to the new building from the DIT Bhaban. It was renamed as RAJUK Bhaban on April 30, 1987, when RAJUK established by replacing Dhaka Improvement Trust (DIT).

Description and architectural value 
Rajuk Bhaban is an important architectural monument of Dhaka city. It is one of the primitive buildings of East Pakistan. It is a very congested building. There were so many black columns in the middle phase of RAJUK bhaban, which created much confusion about the perfect uses of the column in architecture. Architect Thariyani did not think about the climate to design this bhabon. RAJUK Bhaban is mainly a west face Bhaban, which consists of two different buildings named RAJUK, the main building and the RAJUK annex building. These two buildings are connected by a small over bridge.  RAJUK main building is a six storied building and RAJUK annex building is an eight storied building. There is a big clock in the top face of the main building, which bears a great significance RAJUK Bhaban.

Renovation 
RAJUK Bhaban is an example of the architecture of the Pakistan period. In the early period, RAJUK Bhaban looked like a very simple building but recognizing the historical and architectural importance of RAJUK Bhaban, RAJUK took the initiative to renovate it. The main phase of renovation took place after 2000 and introduced a great architectural look to the building.

References 

 Asiatic Society, Architecture, Page no: 498
 Rahman, Mahbubur, City of an Architect, Page no:104, 
 Official Web Site of RAJUK, http://www.rajukdhaka.gov.bd/

RAJUK
Buildings and structures in Dhaka